Regina Pizzeria, also known as Pizzeria Regina, and originally called Regina Pizza, is a regional pizza chain in New England. The company was founded in 1926 by Luigi D'Auria in Boston's North End neighborhood. It has been run by the Polcari family since 1956. The chain is a part of Boston Restaurant Associates and is headquartered in Woburn, Massachusetts.

The original location, at 11 1/2 Thacher Street in Boston's North End, is still in operation and it is the most popular of all the Regina Pizzeria locations. The company also boasts that it makes its own sausage and dough daily from fresh ingredients.

Regina Pizzeria is one of the most well-known pizza restaurants in Boston, and has a rivalry with the also-well-known Santarpio's Pizza.

History 

The first Regina Pizzeria was founded in 1926 by Luigi D'Auria, originally under the name Regina Pizza ("Queen Pizza" in Italian). It is located at 11 1/2 Thacher Street in Boston's North End, and is Boston's oldest pizzeria. When Luigi D'Auria died, he left the restaurant to his grandson, also called Luigi D'Auria. In 1956, Luigi D'Auria (grandson) sold Regina Pizza to the Polcari family, and they have operated the restaurant since.

In May 2015, the parent company filed for bankruptcy protection, closing four underperforming locations (Emerald Square Mall in North Attleborough; Pheasant Lane Mall in Nashua; Mall of New Hampshire in Manchester; and the Arsenal Project mall in Watertown) and saving $70,000 a month.  They hoped to renegotiate leases at Independence Mall in Kingston, Liberty Tree Mall in Danvers, and Solomon Pond Mall in Marlborough.

In 2018, Regina Pizzeria was declared the best pizza restaurant in the United States by TripAdvisor, though a Boston Globe critic pointed out that this is partly due to fame rather than quality.

References

External links
 

Pizza chains of the United States
Restaurants in Boston
Restaurants established in 1926
1926 establishments in Massachusetts
American companies established in 1926
Companies that filed for Chapter 11 bankruptcy in 2015